"La Vie la nuit" is a 1988 song recorded by French pop duet Début de Soirée. Written by William Picard with a music composed by Claude Mainguy and Guy Mattéoni, it was their second single from their album Jardins d'enfants and was released in December 1988. In France, it became a hit, remaining at number two for almost two months.

Music
The music for "La Vie la nuit" is typical of the 1980s synth-pop era. Before the last refrain, the song used a sample from the introduction of "Nuit de folie", the duet previous single.

Critical reception
A review in Pan-European magazine Music & Media presented "La Vie la nuit" as an "uncomplicated, unpretentious, carefree pop in a cheerful, disco setting. Aimed straight at the heart of the charts".

Chart performance
In France, "La Vie la nuit" entered the singles chart at number 11 on the chart edition of 24 December 1988, reached the top ten two weeks later, peaked at number two for non consecutive six weeks, being blocked from the number one slot first by David Hallyday's "High", then the charity single "Pour toi Arménie". It stayed for a total of  14 weeks in the top ten and 21 weeks in the top 50, and was certified Gold disc by the Syndicat National de l'Édition Phonographique. In Belgium (Wallonia), it peaked at number three, and was a top 40 hit in Flanders where it charted for six weeks. On the European Hot 100 Singles, it debuted at number 43 on 14 January 1989, reached a peak of number nine twice, in its fourth and eighth weeks, and fell off the chart after 19 weeks of presence, 11 of them in the top 20.

Track listings

 7" single - France, the Netherlands, Canada
 "La Vie la nuit" — 3:51
 "Week-end Dance" — 3:38

 CD maxi - France, Austria
 "La Vie la nuit" (Pete Hammond remix) — 3:53
 "La Vie la nuit" (extended remix) — 7:32
 "La Vie la nuit" — 3:53
 "Week-end Dance" — 3:29

 12" maxi - France, the Netherlands
 "La Vie la nuit" (extended remix) — 7:30
 "La Vie la nuit" (French remix club) — 6:01
 "La Vie la nuit" (radio version) — 3:50

 7" single - Remix - France
 "La Vie la nuit" (nightlife remix) — 3:51
 "Week-end Dance" — 3:38

 12" maxi - Remix - France, Spain, Ecuador
 "La Vie la nuit" (extended remix) — 7:30
 "La Vie la nuit" (radio version) — 3:50
 "Week-end Dance" — 3:38

Personnel
 Arrangement — Guy Mattéoni
 Artistic direction — Sacha Pichot
 Artwork — Patrick Regout
 Photography — Didier Olivré
 Remix — Pete Hammond

Charts and sales

Weekly charts

Year-end charts

Certifications

Release history

References

Songs about nights
1988 songs
1988 singles
Début de Soirée songs
Male vocal duets
CBS Records singles